Eyam is a civil parish in the Derbyshire Dales district of Derbyshire, England. The parish contains 55 listed buildings that are recorded in the National Heritage List for England. Of these, one is listed at Grade I, the highest of the three grades, two are at Grade II*, the middle grade, and the others are at Grade II, the lowest grade.  The parish contains the village of Eyam and the surrounding countryside.  The history of the village is notable because when the plague broke out in 1666, the village went into voluntary quarantine to prevent the disease from spreading outside.  Some of the listed buildings are associated with this event, including cottages occupied by the victims of the disease, and their gravestones.  Most of the other listed buildings are houses, cottages and farmhouses and associated structures.  The other listed buildings include a church, a cross and tombs in the churchyard, the rectory, a well head, water troughs, a set of stocks, and the former engine house to a lead mine, 


Key

Buildings

References

Citations

Sources

 

 

Lists of listed buildings in Derbyshire